Edward James Lee (1822 – 18 December 1883) was a 19th-century Member of Parliament from the Canterbury region of New Zealand.

He was the returning officer for the 1875 election in Selwyn.

References

1822 births
1883 deaths
Members of the New Zealand House of Representatives
New Zealand MPs for South Island electorates
19th-century New Zealand politicians